Val Potter (born July 23, 1958) is an American politician who served in the Utah House of Representatives from the 3rd district from 2017 to 2020.

Tenure
A former mayor and county councilman, Potter serves on the House Political Subdivisions Committee and the House Transportation Committee. In addition, as an administrator at Utah State University, Potter joins Representative Karen Kwan as the only members of the Higher Education Appropriations Subcommittee with professional experience in higher education.

References

1958 births
Living people
Republican Party members of the Utah House of Representatives
21st-century American politicians